Atlantic Command may refer to:
United States Atlantic Command, 1947–99, U.S. Naval command responsible for guarding the Atlantic shipping lanes during the Cold War 
Atlantic Command (Canadian Army), 1940–44, Canadian Army formation responsible for Atlantic coastal defense
Canadian Northwest Atlantic Command, 1942–45, Allied command responsible for protecting the shipping lanes across the North Atlantic
Allied Command Atlantic, 1953–2003, NATO command in charge of guarding the Atlantic shipping lanes during the Cold War
Command for the Atlantic (as said by NATO Secretary General Jens Stoltenberg on 8 November 2017), or Atlantic command (as reported by media), one of the two new NATO commands to be created pursuant to NATO defense ministers′ decision on 8 November 2017, meant to protect sea lanes ferrying troops and equipment across the Atlantic from the United States.

References